This is a list of owners and executives of the Houston Astros of Major League Baseball.

Owners

Team presidents
 Craig Cullinan (1962)
 Roy Hofheinz (1963-1972)
 Reuben W. Askanase (1973)
 T.H. (Herb) Neyland (1974)
 Sidney Shlenker (1975-1976)
 Tal Smith (1976-1980)
 Al Rosen (1980-1985)
 George Postolos (2011-2013)
 Reid Ryan (2013-2019)

General managers

References

External links
Houston Astros managerial history

Lists of Major League Baseball owners and executives
 
 
Owners and executives